is a 1996 fighting video game developed and published by Angel for the PlayStation and Sega Saturn. It is based upon Naoko Takeuchi's Sailor Moon shōjo manga and anime series. Loosely following the fourth season of the anime series, which adapted the fourth arc of the manga, the players control either one of the five original Inner Senshi or one of the four Outer Senshi as they enter a tournament to fight against each other and become the winning victor. The game was created by most of the same team who worked on previously released fighting titles in the Sailor Moon franchise for the Super Famicom at Angel.

Gameplay 

As with the previously released Bishōjo Senshi Sailor Moon SuperS: Zenin Sanka!! Shuyaku Sōdatsusen on Super Famicom, Bishōjo Senshi Sailor Moon SuperS: Shin Shuyaku Sōdatsusen is a fighting game similar to Street Fighter II: The World Warrior in which the player fights against other opponents in one-on-one matches and the fighter who manages to deplete the health bar of the opponent wins the first bout and the first to win two bouts becomes the winner of the match. Each round is timed, which can be adjusted or deactivated at the options menu screen and if both fighters still have health remaining when time is over, the one with more health wins that round.

The game features various game modes and settings that can be selected on the menu screen. In the single-player mode, players can choose from the six main Senshi and fight against computer-controlled fighters across several locations from the series. Each Senshi have a set of four specials techniques, three power attacks, and their new power from the anime series. These special attack and moves can be performed by inputting a combination of directional and button-based commands. The Outer Senshi, however, only have three powers available to them instead. Players can also customize characters, by assigning up to 20 points to increase the attributes of each of the characters.

Development and release 
Bishōjo Senshi Sailor Moon SuperS: Shin Shuyaku Sōdatsusen was created by most of the same team who worked on previously released fighting titles in the Sailor Moon franchise for the Super Famicom at Angel, with both Kazuhiro Ichikawa and Yoshihiro Okamoto acting as director and producer. Jōji Yuno served as planning adviser, while Jun Maejima and Shizuo Iizawa worked as programmers. The music was composed by Takanori Arisawa, while seiyūs from the anime series returned to reprise their respective roles. Other people also collaborated in its development. The game uses a pre-rendered 3D visual style, similar to the game Killer Instinct.

Bishōjo Senshi Sailor Moon SuperS: Shin Shuyaku Sōdatsusen was first released for PlayStation on March 8, 1996. The original PlayStation release was published by Angel as two editions: A "First Press" edition and a standard edition. Spanish magazine Japanmania reported that a European release of the PlayStation version was considered by Konami but the plan was ultimately scrapped due to the game's poor quality. A Sega Saturn port was announced in mid-1996 under the name Bishōjo Senshi Sailor Moon SuperS: Shin Shuyaku Sōdatsusen Plus, featuring various additions not found in the PlayStation version. The Saturn version was then re-titled as Bishōjo Senshi Sailor Moon SuperS: Various Emotion before launch and later published on November 29, 1996.

Reception 

Both the Saturn and PlayStation versions of the game were met with largely mixed reviews. GameFans Dave Halverson gave the original PlayStation version a largely positive review. Writing for Viz Media's online magazine J-Pop, Ryan MacDonald was critical of the game, stating that "if you like Sailor Moon watch the show, don't import what for the most part is a bad PlayStation fighting game." French magazine Joypad also criticized the Saturn version for its lackluster visuals. Likewise, Reyda Seddiki of French publication Player One also gave the Saturn release a largely negative review. Readers of the Japanese Sega Saturn Magazine voted to give the Saturn port a 2.8979 out of 10 score, ranking at the number 921 spot.

Notes

References

External links 
 Bishōjo Senshi Sailor Moon SuperS: Shin Shuyaku Sōdatsusen at GameFAQs
 Bishōjo Senshi Sailor Moon SuperS: Various Emotion at MobyGames

1996 video games
Japan-exclusive video games
Multiplayer and single-player video games
PlayStation (console) games
Shin Shuyaku Sōdatsusen
Sega Saturn games
Fighting games